The 2013 En Busca de un Ídolo (Spanish for "In search of an idol") was a professional wrestling tournament held by Mexican professional wrestling promotion Consejo Mundial de Lucha Libre (CMLL). CMLL held their second annual En Busca de un Ídolo tournament in 2013, from May 17 until July 21, 2013 with all matches taking place in CMLL's main building, Arena México. Unlike the 2012 tournament where most of the participants were rookies, most of the 2013 En Busca de un Ídolo had been active wrestlers longer than most of the 2012 contestants, shifting the focus from "youth" to where wrestlers generally work on CMLL shows. None of the 2012 participants were included in the 2013 tournament. The "Theme" of the 2013 show was "Ahora o Nunca!" ("Now or Never"). The first round of the tournament involved a Round-robin tournament format where each member of the tecnico (wrestlers who portray the good guys) team will face all four members of the rudo (bad guy) team between May 21 and June 11. The top two point earners from each group then faced off in the second round between June 21 and July 5. The finals of the tournament took July 12, 2013 and saw Vangelis defeat  Valiente to win the tournament.

Participants
Tecnico team
Director: Rush
Trainer: Negro Casas
Valiente
Fuego
Stuka Jr.
El Hijo del Fantasma
Rudo team
Director: El Terrible
Trainer: Virus
Misterioso Jr.
Vangelis
Sangre Azteca
Tiger

Point system
Wrestlers could earn points in a couple of ways during the tournament.
Match results
20 Points for a victory
10 Points for a draw
0 points for a loss

Judging
The tournament also included four judges, referee El Tirantes, Tony Salazar, Último Guerrero and Brazo de Plata. The judges awarded up to 10 points each based on a wrestlers performance, including the way they portray their character, their personality, their charisma, and how much of a fan response they get during their matches.

Online Poll
The third way to earn points for the tournament was through an online poll conducted after each match on the En Busca de un Ídolo website. The online poll could give a wrestler a maximum of 40 additional points in the tournament each week.

Round one
Final score

Round two
Final score

Finals and aftermath
On July 12, 2013 Vangelis defeated Valiente to win the tournament. Following his tournament victory Vangelis was invited to join El Terrible and Rey Bucanero in La Fuerza TRT, pushing Tiger out of the group.

References

2013 in professional wrestling
CMLL En Busca de un Ídolo